Rawcliffe Bridge is a small hamlet in the East Riding of Yorkshire, England.

It forms part of the civil parish of Rawcliffe which lies just to the north-west.

The Aire and Calder Navigation runs just south of Rawcliffe Bridge. Sugar Mill Ponds lies just to the west and is designated as a Local Nature Reserve and was part funded by lottery money.

Rawcliffe Bridge is home to an ex-RAF hardened communications UNITER bunker which is now owned by a security company, next to this site also is a MoD GPSS fuel depot.

References

External links

Sugar Mill Ponds
 Rawcliffe Bridge Primary School

Villages in the East Riding of Yorkshire